Marie Huet (born 20 September 1859, in Paris), was a French painter of the 19th and 20th centuries.

Life 

She was born in Paris. She lived in Paris as well as Solesmes  and Thomery.

She joined the Society of French Artists in 1887 and regularly exhibited her works. Despite the recommendation sent by the writer Emile Goudeau to the painter and jury member Antonio de La Gandara, she never received a mention.

She was associated with the fashion icon Louise Chéruit. In 1898, she took over the fashion house of the Raudnitz sisters, which was soon was renamed Huet & Chéruit and would be a real success, crowned by a Grand Prix at the Universal Exhibition. They counted among their customers Madame Astor, the princess de Broglie, the Duchesse de Gramont and the queen of Romania. The house Huet and Chéruit, the latter assuming sole artistic direction, was then one of the five big names in haute couture that dominated Paris with Callot Soeurs, Jacques Doucet, Jeanne Lanvin and Charles Worth.

She was the model of the American painter Alice Pike Barney.

Gallery

References

External links 

1859 births
Year of death missing
French women painters
19th-century French painters
19th-century French women artists
Painters from Paris